Rahateshwar is a village in the Devgad Taluka of the Sindhudurg district in the state of Maharashtra, India. The village is situated on the bank of a creek of the Arabian Sea and is the location of a temple dedicated to the Hindu deity Shiva. It belongs to konkan division. Rahateshwar village is best known for its Alphonso mangoes and Cashew nuts.

History 
According to the legend of how Rahateshwar's temple came to be built, a man travelling through the forest saw a cow pouring milk on the holy stone known as a pindi.  Then the stone moved from its original location to the bank of a stream.  The banyan tree near where the pindi was found was known as Ratoba Wad, from which the name Rahateshwar derives.  After the holy stone moved, a temple was built by the forefathers of the Kadam clan, the landowners of the village.  They appointed guravs to perform the daily Puja ritual.

See also
 Tulja Bhavani Temple

References

External links
 http://www.mapsofindia.com/villages/maharashtra/sindhudurg/devgad/rahateshwar.html
 http://kadams-kadams.blogspot.com/2010/01/kadams-true-marathas.html?m=1

Villages in Sindhudurg district